The Masalit (Masalit: masala/masara) are an ethnic group inhabiting western Sudan and eastern Chad. They speak the Masalit language

Overview
The Masalit primarily live in Geneina, the capital of west Darfur, a few thousand of them live in  Al Qadarif (East Sudan, in parts of the southern Janub Darfur about 20,000 state.

According to Ethnologue, there were 440,000 total Masalit speakers as of 2011. Of these, 350,000 inhabited Sudan.

Masalit traditions trace their original homeland to Tunisia. Passing through Chad, they eventually settled in the Sudan vicinity.

The Masalit are also known as the Kana Masaraka/Masaraka, Mesalit, and Massalit. They are primarily subsistence agriculturalists, cultivating peanuts and millet. Further south in their territory, they grow various other crops, including sorghum. The typical Masalit dwelling is conical in shape, and constructed of wood and thatch.

Most Masalit today adhere to Islam, which they first adopted in the 17th century through contact with traveling clerics.

Language
The Masalit speak the Masalit language, which belongs to the Maban language family.

Masalit is divided into several dialects, with the variety spoken in South Darfur differing from that of West Darfur. The northern Masalit dialect is spoken to  the east and north of Geneina.

The Masalit language is most closely related to the Marfa, Maba and Karanga languages. It shares 45% of its vocabulary with Marfa, 42% with Maba, and 36% with Karanga.

Most Masalit are bilingual in Arabic, except in the central area, where the Nilo-Saharan vernacular is primarily spoken.

Masalit is written using the Latin script.

Genetics
According to Hassan et al. (2008), around 71.9% of Masalit are carriers of the E1b1b paternal haplogroup. Of these, 73.9% bear the V32 subclade. Approximately 6.3% also belong to the haplogroup J1. This points to significant patrilineal gene flow from neighbouring Afro-Asiatic-speaking populations. The remaining Masalit are primarily carriers of the A3b2 lineage (18.8%), which is instead common among Nilotes.

Maternally, the Masalit entirely belong to African-based derivatives of the macrohaplogroup L according to Hassan (2010). Of these mtDNA clades, the L0a1 (14.6%) and L1c (12.2%) lineages are most frequent. This altogether suggests that the genetic introgression into the Masalit's ancestral population was asymmetrical, occurring primarily through Afro-Asiatic-speaking males rather than females.

Notable Masalit people

Usumain Baraka (born 1994), activist

See also
War in Darfur

Notes

External links
The Hidden Slaughter and Ethnic Cleansing in Western Sudan: An Open Letter to the International Community (1999)
Massaleit.info

Ethnic groups in Chad
Ethnic groups in Sudan
African nomads
Darfur